Vanessa Lee (born 25 November 1988) is a Canadian professional archer and physiotherapist of Korean origin. She has represented Canada at the 2011 Pan American Games and at the 2013 World Archery Championships.

References 

1988 births
Living people
Canadian female archers
University of Toronto alumni
Sportspeople from Toronto
Canadian sportspeople of Korean descent
Canadian physiotherapists
21st-century Canadian women